Lam Tung Pang is a Hong Kong artist, and one of the founders of the Fotanian art movement in Hong Kong. He lives and works in London and Hong Kong. His work focuses on themes such as collective memory and humanity.

Lam's artworks are a combination of traditional (oil, acrylic, charcoal, and pencil) and non-traditional (nails, sand, and plywood) materials to explores the relationship between objects and materials.

First studio 
During his college years, Lam struggled with creativity, stating that, "When no one gives you a topic, you have to come up with something out of nothing". His main struggle was with time management. During his second year at college, he wanted freedom from the school's expectations. His desire was to control his own pace, as he was aware that college was a temporary aspect of his life. "What would I do in the future? Actually, no one cared. There are a lot of possible paths or you can just wander aimlessly", said Lam.

Lam rented a place as a studio in Fo Tan with friends. At that time, he consciously set about making art his career.

Studying in London 
After graduating from the Chinese University of Hong Kong in 2002, Lam Tung Pang's focus remained on creating art.

In 2003, he decided to leave Hong Kong on a scholarship to study for a Master of Arts degree at Central Saint Martins College of Art and Design in London and completed the degree in 2004. During his time studying in London, he resided in a friend's living room, which he found to be a struggle but regards it as the most valuable experience ever.

He did not do part-time job because he preferred to live simply not to waste time and money so that he could have full control of his time.  By his second year in London, he had used up all his funding but claims he had the greatest freedom at that time. With the luxury and freedom of time, Lam felt he could see different things.

In 2005, Lam became the first Chinese artist to win the Hunting Art Prize in the UK. He is also one of the few Hong Kong artists to have exhibited at the Tate Modern, an internationally acclaimed modern art museum.

Lam received further recognition in 2009 when he became the recipient of Hong Kong Contemporary Art Biennial Awards.

Lam's artworks creation

Observation

Lam Tung Pang's works are based on his observations of his surroundings.

When he was in London, Lam visited local museums to see the originals of works of art he had seen in textbooks. Back in Hong Kong, he re-thought how to integrate his creative work in his surroundings in order to establish a closer relationship. He discovered that Hong Kong has a wealth of creative work and artistic resources. He was inspired to explore Hollywood Road in Sheung Wan and the Hong Kong Heritage Museum in Shatin where he saw ancient pottery statues, leading him to develop his "Antique" series.

Environment
Lam's collections include re-imaginings of the living environment of the population, or as a metaphor for his own environment and as an exploration of the ultimate urban existence, contributing to Lam's research for the ideal way to live.

Lam expresses his observation and concerns in his works regarding the environment, life and culture. Lam has created various works about polar bears to visually represent similarities between the environment of polar bears and humans. Lam believed that the state of being a polar bear could be very similar to the environment that each of the individuals lived in.

Exhibitions 
Lam Tung Pang has exhibited his work worldwide and has worked in both private and public collections, including Deutsche Bank and the Hong Kong Museum of Art. He has been commissioned by the Legislative Council of Hong Kong.

Solo exhibitions

Group exhibitions

Exhibitions
Play, Espace Louis Vuitton Hong Kong in 2014

In PLAY, Lam utilizes toys to create large-scale paintings and installations. Lam sought to address how toys often reflect the "utopia" of a child's mind, and to contrast it with an adult perspective, which he saw as being complicated through accumulated life experiences. Lam sought to pose questions about artistic and creative processes through the act of playing.
 
The exhibition highlights Lam's study of materials. The artist collects toys from his private domestic environment as well as travel journeys. Curating a miniature museum that documents our systems of learning, the exhibition space features toy installations, that are a result of highly personal encounters. Playing with these found objects raises questions about growth, human experiences and the development of the adult mind, ideas which provide continuous inspiration to the artist.
 
Long View Under Scrutiny, Hanart TZ Gallery, Hong Kong in 2011

Developed as an extension of the Diorama series presented in 2010, Long View Under Scrutiny exhibits new work that continues Lams reflection upon self and environment. Investigating a culturally acquired perception of memory in comparison to reality in this exhibition, Lam placed one of his personal works, Folding (2006), a self-portrait within a hinged wood box created during his four years living in London, alongside his creations, including The Youngest and the Oldest (2011), a five-panel work on plywood.

Awards

References 

Hong Kong artists
Living people
Year of birth missing (living people)